William Western Knatchbull-Hugessen (23 May 1837 – 6 September 1864) was an English amateur cricketer who played in three first-class cricket matches in 1858 and 1859.

Biography
The youngest son of Sir Edward Knatchbull, 9th Baronet and his second wife Fanny, Knatchbull-Hugessen was born William Western Knatchbull at the family estate of Mersham-le-Hatch near Ashford in Kent in 1837. Hugessen was added to the family name following the death of Sir Edward in 1849 as a condition of the will. He was educated at Eton College before going up to Magdalen College, Oxford in 1855.

Despite not playing for either the Eton or Oxford cricket teams, Knatchbull-Huggesen played cricket for the Gentlemen of Kent side between 1856 and 1860, generally as a wicket-keeper. He made two appearances for the side in matches which have been given first-class status, both in 1858 against Gentlemen of England sides. He was a member of the management committee which set up the Maidstone based Kent County Club in 1859 and played one first-class match for the side that year. In his three first-class matches he scored a total of 33 runs with his highest score of nine coming in his match for Kent. He did not bowl.

At the 1861 census, Knatchbull-Hugessen was farming at Provender House at Norton, close to Faversham in Kent, an estate which had been in the Hugessen family since the 17th-century. He resigned from the Kent management committee in 1863 due to ill health and died of tuberculosis at St Leonards-on-Sea in Sussex in September 1864, aged 27. A memorial tablet was erected in the church of St John the Baptist in Mersham.

Family
Knatchbull-Hugessen's brother, Edward became the first Baron Brabourne in 1880. Edward's son Cecil, who later became the fourth Baron Brabourne, also played first-class cricket, mainly playing for Cambridge University, but also made one appearance for Kent. His uncle, Henry Knatchbull had played for Kent sides between 1827 and 1848 whilst Knatchbull-Hugessen's brother, Henry Thomas, took his place on the Kent management committee and was the club's president in 1880.

References

External links

1837 births
1864 deaths
English cricketers
Kent cricketers
Gentlemen of Kent cricketers
Younger sons of baronets
William
19th-century deaths from tuberculosis
Tuberculosis deaths in England